Cervialto is a mountain of Campania, Italy.

Mountains of Campania